Major General Sir Neville Reginald Howse,  (26 October 1863 – 19 September 1930) was an Australian Army officer, medical doctor, and politician. He was the first Australian recipient of the Victoria Cross (VC), the highest decoration for gallantry "in the face of the enemy" that can be awarded to members of the British and Commonwealth armed forces.

Howse was born in Somerset, England, and followed his father into the medical profession. He emigrated to Australia in 1889 and eventually settled in Orange, New South Wales. During the Boer War, Howse served with the Australian medical corps. He was awarded the VC for his rescue of a wounded man at Vredefort in July 1900, while under heavy rifle fire. During the First World War, Howse served in New Guinea, Gallipoli, and on the Western Front. He oversaw the medical services of the Australian Imperial Force (AIF) and finished the war with the rank of major-general. He was elected to parliament in 1922, and was subsequently appointed to cabinet by Stanley Bruce. He served as Minister for Defence (1925–1927), Health (1925–1927; 1928–1929), and Home and Territories (1928).

Early life
Howse was born in Stogursey, Somerset, England, the son of Lucy Elizabeth (née Conroy) and Alfred Howse. He was educated at Fullard's House School in Taunton. He chose to follow his father (a surgeon) into the medical profession, studying medicine at London Hospital. He attained the qualifications MRCS and LRCP in 1886, and subsequently became a demonstrator in anatomy at the University of Durham.

In 1889, Howse immigrated to Australia for health reasons. He initially settled in Newcastle, New South Wales, but later moved to Taree. He returned to England in 1895 for further studies, obtaining the rank of FRCS in 1897. He moved back to Australia in 1899 and bought a medical practice in Orange, which would remain his primary residence for the next 30 years except during his overseas military service.

Military service

Boer War
Howse served in the Second Boer War with the Second Contingent of the New South Wales Army Medical Corps, Australian Forces, arriving at East London, Eastern Cape, in February 1900 as a lieutenant.

On 24 July 1900, during the action at Vredefort, South Africa, Howse saw a trumpeter fall, and went through very heavy cross-fire to rescue the man. His horse was soon shot from under him, but he continued on foot, reached the casualty, dressed his wound, and then carried him to safety. For this action, Howse was awarded the Victoria Cross. The award was gazetted on 4 June 1901 and the original citation reads:

He thus became the first recipient of the Victoria Cross serving in the Australian armed forces; his medal is on display at the Australian War Memorial in Canberra. Howse was subsequently promoted to captain on 15 October 1900.

The Second Contingent left South Africa via Cape Town on 13 December 1900 on the S.S. Orient, however Howse had been invalided to Britain on 28 November 1900. Howse subsequently returned to Australia at the end of February 1901. Following the gazetting of his VC, Howse was presented with the medal in a ceremony at Victoria Barracks, Sydney on 4 December 1901. Also at the ceremony were Captain A. Heathcote and Sergeant J. Paton, prior recipients of the VC for actions during the Indian Rebellion of 1857, who had subsequently migrated to New South Wales.

Howse returned to South Africa as a major with the Australian Army Medical Corps (AAMC) in command of the Bearer Company, arriving at Durban in Natal on 17 March 1902. Following service in Natal, Orange River Colony and Western Transvaal (attached to Colonel A.W. Thornycroft's Mounted Infantry Column), at the conclusion of the war he became seriously ill. He was again invalided to Britain on 6 July 1902, with the remainder of the AAMC contingent departing for Australia on 8 July 1902. Howse eventually returned to Australia in November 1902.

In 1905 Howse married Evelyn Pilcher in Bathurst, and was twice elected to serve as mayor of the City of Orange.

First World War

When the First World War began, Howse was appointed principal medical officer to the Australian Naval and Military Expeditionary Force to German New Guinea, with the rank of lieutenant colonel.

Following his time in New Guinea, he was appointed Assistant Director of Medical Services 1st Australian Division. During the Gallipoli campaign he took charge of evacuating wounded men from the beach in the campaign’s opening days. In 1917 at the Dardanelles commission, he described the arrangements for dealing with wounded men at Gallipoli as inadequate to the point of 'criminal negligence'.  He was Mentioned in Despatches for his service in this campaign.

In September 1915 he was given command of ANZAC medical services and in November became director of the AIF’s medical services, with the rank of surgeon-general. When the Australian Imperial Force moved to France, Howse took up a position in London, overseeing medical services in France, Egypt and Palestine. At the beginning of 1917 he was promoted to major general.

Howse was appointed a Companion of the Order of the Bath (CB) in the 1915 King's Birthday Honours, was promoted to Knight Commander of the Order of the Bath (KCB) on 22 January 1917, and appointed Knight of Grace of the Order of the Hospital of St John of Jerusalem and Knight Commander of the Order of St Michael and St George (KCMG) in 1919. From 1921 to 1925 he was Director-General of Medical Services.

Politics

In 1922, Howse resigned his army commission to enter politics, as regulations at the time forbade political campaigning by members of the regular army. He was elected to the House of Representatives, standing for the Nationalist Party in the Division of Calare. He subsequently represented Australia at the League of Nations Assembly in 1923. In January 1925, Howse was elevated to cabinet by Prime Minister Stanley Bruce as Minister for Defence and Minister for Health. In the defence portfolio his primary responsibility was for repatriation. He was a member of the Australian delegation to the 1926 Imperial Conference in London, but was taken ill and had to resign his portfolios in April 1927. He was kept on in the ministry as an honorary minister without portfolio.

In February 1928, Howse was reappointed Minister for Health and also made Minister for Home and Territories. He relinquished the latter portfolio in November 1928 after that year's election. Howse made a significant impact during his two periods as health minister. He helped establish the Federal Health Council of Australia, supported the formation of the Australian College of Surgeons and the first conference of Australian cancer organisations, and was instrumental in the decision to site the Australian Institute of Anatomy in Canberra. In 1928, he convinced cabinet to spend the considerable sum of £100,000 to establish one of the world's first radium banks, allowing Australia to become a centre of radiological research. He was also credited with inspiring public confidence in Commonwealth Serum Laboratories and the government's immunisation programs, at a time when a series of fatalities had led to a distrust of immunisation among the general population.

Howse lost his seat in parliament in the Labor landslide at the 1929 election.

Death and legacy

In February 1930, Howse travelled to England for medical treatment for cancer, but died on 19 September 1930, and is buried at Kensal Green Cemetery, London. His son, John Howse, was member for Calare from 1946 to 1960.

A statue by Peter Dornan depicting Howse's act of bravery is on display at the Royal Australasian College of Surgeons, Melbourne.

A postage stamp commemorating Howse was issued by Australia Post in 2000.

A one dollar coin designed by Wojciech Pietranik commemorating the centenary of Howse's feat of arms was issued by the Royal Australian Mint in 2000.

He was a freemason.

Honours and awards

Notes

References

The Register of the Victoria Cross (This England, 1997)
Victoria Crosses of the Anglo-Boer War (Ian Uys, 2000)
Who’s who in Australian Military History

External links

 
 "The emerging office of the Surgeon General", Lieutenant Colonel Robert L Pearce, Australian Defence Force Health Journal, April 2002
Biographical Notes by Ross Mallett on his AIF Order of Battle pages.
Speech at launch of commemorative stamp issue by John Howard, Prime Minister of Australia in Orange, New South Wales, 23 July 2000.
Australian Nurses in the Second Boer War – notes on the New South Wales Medical Corps in South Africa.
Record on AIF Project database

1863 births
1930 deaths
Australian Army officers
Australian generals
Australian recipients of the Victoria Cross
Burials at Kensal Green Cemetery
Australian Knights Commander of the Order of St Michael and St George
Australian Knights Commander of the Order of the Bath
Australian politicians awarded knighthoods
Members of the Australian House of Representatives
Members of the Australian House of Representatives for Calare
Members of the Cabinet of Australia
Nationalist Party of Australia members of the Parliament of Australia
People from Orange, New South Wales
People from West Somerset (district)
Second Boer War recipients of the Victoria Cross
English emigrants to Australia
Australian Freemasons
Defence ministers of Australia
20th-century Australian politicians
Fellows of the Royal College of Surgeons
Australian Ministers for Health
Military personnel from Somerset
Australian military personnel of World War I